Eva Birnerová and Petra Cetkovská were the defending champions, but both players chose not to participate.
Ashleigh Barty and Sally Peers won the title defeating Réka-Luca Jani and Maria João Koehler in the final 7–6(7–2), 3–6, [10–5].

Seeds

Draw

Draw

References
 Main Draw

Nottingham Challenge - Doubles
2012 Women Doubles